Sundara (सुन्दर) is a Sanskrit term meaning beautiful, lovely (of a person), or generally, noble; well, right. As a personal name, it may refer to:

Sundara Ramaswamy (1931–2006), Tamil poet and writer
Ajahn Sundara (born 1946), French-born ordained monastic in the Buddhist Thai Forest Tradition of Ajahn Chah
M. S. Sundara Rajan (born 1950), Indian banker, economist and head of Indian Bank
Maravarman Sundara Pandyan, Pandyan king from 1216 and 1238
Jatavarman Sundara Pandyan I, Pandyan king from 1251 to 1268

Other uses
Sundara Kanda, the fifth book in the Hindu epic, the Ramayana